Blažo Jovanović bridge is a bridge across the Morača river in Podgorica, Montenegro. The bridge is located near the confluence of the Ribnica and Morača rivers and is part of the Saint Peter of Cetinje boulevard. It is 115.20m long and 22.35m wide and the city's busiest bridge.

History

Most Blaža Jovanovića was constructed between 1948 and 1950. It was projected by the famous Serbian architect Branko Žeželj. The bridge was named after the Montenegrin national hero Blažo Jovanović. The bridge underwent a major reconstruction in 2008 and was officially re-opened in March 2009.

References

Bridges completed in 1950
Bridges in Podgorica
Tourist attractions in Podgorica